is a Japanese composer, a Gagaku performer and researcher, as well as a music arranger. His former last and first name was Konoe Toshitake (近衛俊健).

Career
He was born in the city of Osaka, Higashi-ku, Kyuhoji as the second son (illegitimate child) to Hidemaro Konoye of the Konoe family. His mother was Fumiko Tsuboi (坪井文子). His father, Hidemaro, registered his birth certificate at the East Ward (Higashiku) city hall in Osaka on 22 July 1937.

On 19 October 1939, he was adopted by the youngest brother of his father Tadamaro Miyagawa (水谷川忠麿) and he was renamed Tadatoshi (忠俊). His youngest memory was being in an atelier of Tadamaro in Sendagaya, Tokyo and has no recollection of his real birth mother.
While he was studying at the Gakushūin Elementary School they moved to Nara and he went to the elementary school (co-ed) which is attached to the women University in Nara and he also finished junior high and high school at the same school. Upon graduating high school he moved back to Tokyo and became assistant to Naozumi Yamamoto who is a composer and conductor.

In August 1962, he passed the exam to be a full scholarship student at the Madrid Royal Conservatory of Music in Spain. In 1963, he studied in the Berlin Municipal Conservatory of Music (which is now the Berlin University of the Arts, or UdK). His first daughter, Yoko, was born in Berlin, West Germany. In 1968, he returned to Japan just before his second daughter was born.

His brother Hidetake Konoe is also a composer and conductor. His wife, Sakiko, is the daughter of viscount Suefusa Ano (阿野季房) from the Ano family of Northern Fujiwara clan. Sakiko was a classmate of his from the Gakushūin Elementary School in Tokyo where the children of the Imperial aristocracy (Kuge) were educated. His oldest daughter, Yoko Miyagawa, is a violinist and his second daughter Yuko Miyagawa is a cellist.

Movies

Folk song
Summer Festival them song :fr:Matsumoto Bon Bon

TV drama music
TBS "Yasubee's Ocean" (1969–1970)
Fuji TV "White Terror" (1975)
NHK "New Western circumstances (3) Miso soup fanatics go to Europe" (1977)
TV Tokyo "The Dangerous Evening that Wives Bought" (1988)

Ancestry
As a patrilineal descendant of the Konoe family, Miyagawa is a nephew of former Japanese Prime Minister Konoe Fumimaro, and is a first cousin once removed of both the former prime minister Hosokawa Morihiro and his brother Tadateru Konoe. By virtue of his descent from the Konoe family, he is related to the Japanese imperial family, being a descendant of Emperor Go-Yōzei.

References

Ohno Yoshi "Konoe Hidemaro - A man who made a Japanese orchestra" Kodansha, 2006. 

1935 births
20th-century classical composers
20th-century Japanese composers
20th-century Japanese male musicians
Gagaku
Japanese classical composers
Japanese male classical composers
Konoe family
Living people